is a Japanese announcer, news anchor, television reporter, and television personality for NHK. She is the anchor for NHK's weekday evening news show NHK News 7. She was the co-host for NHK's geological TV series Bura Tamori, as well as a newsreader for morning news show NHK News Ohayō Nippon.

Early years
Hayashida was born in Nagasaki Prefecture, which was her parents' birthplace. She was raised in Kanagawa Prefecture, Japan.  She attended Shonan Shirayuri Gakuen Junior and Senior High School, founded by Sisters of Charity of St. Paul. She received the Bachelor's Degree in Music and the Master's Degree of Music from Tokyo University of the Arts in 2012 and 2014 respectively, researching musicology.

During college, Hayashida was a student newscaster on News Access (by BS Asahi) and au Headline (the news app run by au).

Career
Hayashida started her broadcasting career at NHK Nagasaki Broadcasting Station in 2014. In February 2016, Hayashida was relocated to NHK Fukuoka Broadcasting Station, hosting Rokuichi! Fukuoka, following Yurie Omi. She also stars NHK News and News 845 Fukuoka.

Since April 2018 Hayashida has hosted Bura Tamori and the first part of NHK News Ohayō Nippon. Those programs are also the jobs she took over from Omi.

In the midnight of January 1, 2019, Hayashida appeared on TV as a correspondent at Tokyo International Airport in Yukutoshi Kurutoshi, NHK's annual New Year's Eve television special, with Kozo Takase and Mayuko Wakuda.

NHK announced on February 13, 2020, that Hayashida would step back from the host for Bura Tamori and hand it over to Rika Asano in April 2020. On March 14, she appeared her last episode of it. Hayashida also resigned from NHK News Ohayō Nippon to be the anchor for Shutoken Network airing in Tokyo Metropolis and peripheral prefectures.

In 2021, Hayashida narrated the travel segment of Taiga Drama Seiten wo Tsuke (English title: Reach Beyond the Blue Sky).

On February 9, 2022, NHK announced that Hayashida would be the anchor for weekday evening news program NHK News 7 from April.

On February 8, 2023, NHK announced that she would be the anchor for evening news program News Watch 9 from April.

See also
 Tamori

References

External links
 Risa Hayashida, NHK Announcement Room

|-

|-

1989 births
Living people
Tokyo University of the Arts alumni
Japanese announcers
Japanese television personalities
Japanese television presenters
Japanese women television presenters
People from Nagasaki Prefecture
People from Kanagawa Prefecture